Guido Calcagnini (25 September 1725 in Ferrara – 17 August 1807 in Osimo) was an Italian cardinal and titular archbishop in the Roman Catholic Church.

Life
He was born into a noble family, as the son of the count palatine Cesare Calcagnini, marquess of Fusignano and a relation of cardinal Carlo Leopoldo Calcagnini. He studied at the Collegio dei Nobili di San Carlo at Modena and then at the Sapienza in Rome – at the latter, on 15 May 1747, he gained a doctorate in theology and in utroque iure.

He entered the papal court as private chamberlain to the pope in 1746.

References

External links

1725 births
1807 deaths
18th-century Italian cardinals
18th-century Italian Roman Catholic titular archbishops
Religious leaders from Ferrara
Apostolic Nuncios to the Kingdom of Naples
Cardinals created by Pope Pius VI